Dickinson High School is located in Dickinson, Texas, United States, in the Dickinson Independent School District. The school serves most of Dickinson, all of San Leon, the majority of Bacliff, and portions of League City and Texas City.

The school colors are blue and white with red trims. The Dickinson Gators' school mascot is "Big Al" the alligator.

School awards

Football 
 Texas Class 3A State Champions: 1977.

Band/Orchestra 
 Texas  Class 4A State Marching Band Champions: 1986, 1989, 1990, 1991, and 1993, all under the direction of Mr. Donnie Owens and Mr. John Gossett. In 1995 and 1997, the band placed 2nd under the direction of Mr. Greg Goodman, and in 2007 won 3rd place in the same competition under the direction of Mr. Wade McDonald. The band also placed 4th in 1987 and 2nd in 1988.
 Bands of America Southwest Regional Competition, Best in Class: 1989, 1992, 1993, 1994, 1996, and 1997.

Notable alumni 
Andre Ware '86, Quarterback for University of Houston '90, 1989 Heisman Trophy winner, first round selection (#7 overall) in the 1990 NFL Draft by the Detroit Lions
Tracy Scoggins '70, Actress, Babylon 5.
Dennis Cook '81, Major League baseball player.
Donnie Little '78, Quarterback and wide receiver for the University of Texas '82, and four years at wide receiver for the Ottawa Rough Riders in the Canadian Football League.
Hal Dues, Major League Baseball player.
Craig Bohmler '74, composer.

References

External links 
 
 Dickinson ISD
 Dickinson ISD Alumni Association
 Dickinson High School Band

Educational institutions in the United States with year of establishment missing
High schools in Galveston County, Texas
Greater Houston
Galveston Bay Area
Public high schools in Texas